Cataraqui Centre, (formerly "Cataraqui Town Centre") is a shopping mall located in Kingston, Ontario, Canada. It is the largest mall in southeastern Ontario with over 141 stores. The anchor store is a Hudson's Bay, There is also a vacant anchor store last occupied by Sears. It also includes a major transfer point for Kingston Transit with the Isabel Turner library branch at the edge of the parking lot.

Anchors and majors

Hudson's Bay  (113,054 sq ft.)
H&M (19,834 sq ft.)
Sport Chek (19,126 sq ft.)
Shoppers Drug Mart (9,800 sq ft)
Indigo Books (115,307 sq ft.)

Previous anchors
Cataraqui Town Centre opened in September, 1982 as a two level mall with Simpsons and Zellers department stores and a Loblaws supermarket. Simpsons was rebranded as The Bay (another brand within the same chain, the Hudson's Bay Company) in 1986. In September 1999, Sears relocated from the Kingston Centre to a new store at Cataraqui which anchored a new addition. Along with the new addition came a revamping of the mall's interior, and the relocation of the escalators and food court. Loblaws moved across the street in 2001, and their former space was converted to a new expanded food court, Shoppers Drug Mart, and a Sport Chek store. Zellers was replaced with Target in 2013; the latter closed in 2015.

External links
 Cataraqui Centre website

Buildings and structures in Kingston, Ontario
Shopping malls in Ontario
Shopping malls established in 1982
Tourist attractions in Kingston, Ontario